Matt Huuki (born April 23, 1977) was a Republican member of the Michigan House of Representatives who served one term representing the western end of the Upper Peninsula.

References

1977 births
Living people
People from Hancock, Michigan
American people of Finnish descent
Republican Party members of the Michigan House of Representatives
21st-century American politicians